Shalivahan Singh Tanwar was heir apparent and son of Ramshah Tanwar the Tomar king of Gwalior. They were ousted by Akbar and sought refuge in Mewar which at the time was the only state who refused Akbar as head of state.

He, along with his father, Ramshah Tomar and 300 others including his brothers, were martyred in Battle of Haldighati. His sons survived and were given Thikanas in Lakhansar (Bikaner), Khetasar and Kelawa (Jodhpur) and Dalniya (Jaipur).

Lineage 
Tanwar Descendants of Sohan Singh s/o Anangpal Tomar of Delhi - ruler in the 12th century.
 Virsingh nearly A.D.1375
 Uddhharandev    A.D.1400
 Vikramdev
 Ganapatidev     A.D.1419
 Dugarendrasingh
 Kalyanmalla
 Man Singh Tomar     A.D.1486
 Vikramaditya Tomar, fought against Babur
 Ramshah Tomar
 Shalivahan Singh Tomar, married a daughter of Udai Singh II of Mewar

Progeny 
 Shyamshah Tomar, heir apparent to the Tomar throne of Gwalior, took service under Akbar after Maharana Pratap's demise in 1597 AD.
 Mitrasen Tomar
 Rao Dharmagat
 His descendants were given Thikanas in Lakhansar (Bikaner), Khetasar and Kelawa (Jodhpur) and Dalniya (Jaipur).

References 

People from Gwalior
Year of death unknown
Year of birth unknown